Warren Wright may refer to:
 Warren Wright (politician), American politician in Illinois
 Warren Wright Sr., American racehorse owner and breeder

See also
 Warren T. Wright Farmhouse Site, Sussex County, Delaware